The Online Film Critics Society Award for Best Adapted Screenplay is an annual film award given by the Online Film Critics Society to honor the best screenplay (adapted from another medium) of the year.

Winners

1990s

2000s

2010s

2020s

References
OFCS - Awards

Screenwriting awards for film